Elizabeth Harrower (8 February 1928 – 7 July 2020) was an Australian novelist and short story writer. She has been considered "one of the great novelists of Sydney". Much of her work tackles the theme of domestic abuse, particularly the psychological abuse of vulnerable women at the hands of their manipulative, deceitful and tyrannical male partners.

Early life
She was born in Sydney but spent her childhood in industrial Newcastle, New South Wales, living with her grandmother after the divorce of her parents. One of her uncles died in the Sandakan death marches.
She lived in London from 1951 to 1959. On her return to Sydney she worked as a reviewer for The Sydney Morning Herald, for the ABC, and in publishing.

Career
Harrower published her first three novels in quick succession, beginning with Down in the City in 1957. Novelist Christina Stead was a champion of her work, praising The Long Prospect in particular. In 1971 her fifth novel In Certain Circles was set to be published until she abruptly withdrew it from publication following the death of her mother.

In an interview with The Australian, Harrower claimed that she had written the book under pressure after receiving a grant and called the act of writing it "forced labour". Afterwards she published a few short stories before giving her writing up entirely by 1977.

In 2012, following a period of obscurity during which all of her novels fell out of print, Harrower experienced a small revival when Michael Heyward and Penny Hueston, editors of the independent press Text Publishing, began to reprint her works. They attempted to persuade Harrower to publish In Certain Circles and she eventually acquiesced, allowing the novel to be published in 2014. The novel received positive reviews and renewed interest in all of Harrower's novels. In 2015, a collection of stories from throughout Harrower's career was published as A Few Days in the Country: And Other Stories.

Death
Harrower died on 7 July 2020, aged 92.

Awards and nominations
1968: Commonwealth Literary Fund fellowship
1974: Australian Council for the Arts fellowship
1996: Patrick White Award
2015: Voss Literary Prize for In Certain Circles
2015 In Certain Circles short-listed for the New South Wales Premier's Literary Awards
2016: Queensland Literary Awards - University of Southern Queensland Australian Short Story Collection - Steele Rudd Award — co-winner for A Few Days in the Country and other stories

Bibliography

Novels
 Down in the City (1957)
 The Long Prospect (1958)
 The Catherine Wheel (1960)
 The Watch Tower (1966)
 In Certain Circles (2014)

Short fiction
Collections
 A Few Days in the Country: And Other Stories (2015)
Stories

References

External links
Elizabeth Harrower profile, textpublishing.com.au; accessed 23 July 2020.
"Elizabeth Harrower doesn't want spoilers to her own novel", The Sydney Morning Herald, 3 May 2014.

1928 births
2020 deaths
Patrick White Award winners
Writers from Sydney
Australian women novelists
The New Yorker people
Place of death missing